Cheikh Bouamama or Shaykh Bu 'Amamah led a popular resistance against French occupation in Algeria from 1881 to 1908.

Cheikh Bouamama was a leader of the tribe Awlad Sidi Shaykh.
The resistance that he led in the southwest of Algeria from 1881 to 1908..

The Algerian filmmaker Benamar Bakhti made the 1983 film L'Épopée de Cheikh Bouamama ("The Epic of Cheikh Bouamama").

See also
 Invasion of Algiers in 1830
 Abdelkader al-Jazairi
 Sherif Boubaghla
 Mokrani Revolt
 Algerian War
 Massacre of Saïda (1881)

Notes

References

 
 

1833 births
1908 deaths
Algerian rebels
Algerian independence activists